Estonia entered the Eurovision Song Contest 1999, held in Jerusalem. This was their fifth entry at Eurovision, having debuted at the 1994 contest.

The Estonian representative for the contest was Evelin Samuel and Camille with the song "Diamond of Night". It was the first contest with non-Estonian songs in the national final and the first time a non-Estonian song was picked to represent Estonia.

Before Eurovision

Eurolaul 1999 
The final was held on 30 January 1999 at the ETV Studios in Tallinn. It was hosted by Romi Erlach and Marko Reikop.

The format of the final was the same as in previous years, with a 10-member "expert" international jury awarding points to their favourite songs from the 10 in the final. The jury that voted in the final included 1997 Eurovision winner Katrina Leskanich from the United Kingdom, Bjorgvin Halldorsson from Iceland, Nana Mouskouri from Greece (who represented Luxembourg in 1963) and conductors Anders Berglund from Sweden, Noel Kelehan from Ireland and Kobi Oshrat from Israel (the latter of whom also composed 1979 winner "Hallelujah," which he performed as an interval act during the show).

Judges
 Anders Berglund (frequent conductor for Swedish entries, including 1991 winner "Fångad av en stormvind", musical director for the 1992 contest)
 Raimonds Pauls
 Andrej Karoli
 Björgvin Halldórsson (represented Iceland at the 1995 contest)
 Manfred Witt
 
 Noel Kelehan (frequent conductor for Irish entries, including five winning songs, musical director for all Irish-hosted contests between 1981 and 1995)
 Katrina Leskanich (lead singer of Katrina and the Waves, the winners of the 1997 contest)
 Nana Mouskouri (represented Luxembourg at the 1963 contest)
 Kobi Oshrat (composer and conductor of several Israeli entries, including 1979 winner "Hallelujah")

At Eurovision
Samuel and Rätsep performed last of 23 countries, succeeding the entry from Bosnia and Herzegovina. At the close of the voting it had received 90 points, placing 6th.

Voting

References 

1999
Countries in the Eurovision Song Contest 1999
Eurovision